Ethel Emma McMillan  (née Black, 12 May 1904 – 13 August 1987) was a New Zealand politician of the Labour Party. She was a Member of Parliament for Dunedin electorates for 22 years, but despite her political seniority, was not appointed a cabinet minister. She was very active in local affairs in Otago and was the first woman to be elected to Dunedin City Council.

Biography

Early life
McMillan was born at Kaiti, Gisborne, in 1904. She was dux and prefect at Gisborne Girls' High School. She graduated with honours in history from the University of Otago in 1926. She lectured in history at Otago for a year, during which time she met the medical student and her future husband, Gervan McMillan. She then taught at Nelson College for Girls for three years.

After their wedding on 4 September 1929 at Gisborne, they settled in Kurow, where he had worked as a locum and then purchased the medical practice. He was cabinet minister for a year, but retired from Parliament in 1943 to concentrate on his medical practice. Gervan McMillan died from a heart disease in 1951, aged 46.

During their time in Kurow, the McMillans had friendships and political discussions with their neighbours, Arnold Nordmeyer and Jerry Skinner; both would become influential MPs for the Labour Party. They also hosted Michael Joseph Savage, who in 1935 would become Prime Minister. Her husband had been involved with the Labour Party since 1923, and Ethel McMillan joined the party in about 1930.

Local politics
McMillan had a distinguished local career in Dunedin. She was the first woman to be elected onto Dunedin City Council in 1950 (the second woman was elected in 1970) and remained a councillor until 1980. In 1960, she became the first New Zealand woman to be appointed a trustee to a savings bank. She chaired the local savings bank's board from 1964. She had governance roles with the Dunedin Public Art Gallery Society, the Otago Museum Trust, and the New Zealand Library Association.

Parliamentary career

Although she was a senior parliamentarian when Labour came to power in 1972, she was not elected to cabinet, possibly due to her strained relation with Norman Kirk. However, she did serve as Labour's Spokesperson for Health in Kirk's Shadow Cabinet. She was known as the 'Queen of Quiz' in Parliament for the numerous questions that she asked.

Later life
She was appointed a Companion of the Queen's Service Order for public services in the 1976 New Year Honours, and many felt that she should have received more official recognition. She died in Dunedin on 13 August 1987.

Three short streets close to the University of Otago campus were renamed in 1993 (New Zealand women's suffrage centenary year) to honour McMillan, Emily Siedeberg, and Ethel Benjamin.

Notes

References

Women in Parliamentary Life 1970-1990: Hocken Lecture 1993 by Marilyn Waring, page 33 (Hocken Library, University of Otago, 1994) 

New Zealand Labour Party MPs
Women members of the New Zealand House of Representatives
University of Otago alumni
Academic staff of the University of Otago
People from Gisborne, New Zealand
1904 births
1987 deaths
New Zealand MPs for Dunedin electorates
Nelson College for Girls faculty
Members of the New Zealand House of Representatives
Companions of the Queen's Service Order
Dunedin City Councillors
20th-century New Zealand politicians
20th-century New Zealand women politicians
People educated at Gisborne Girls' High School